The West Street Foundry was an American steam engineering works notable for producing marine steam engines in the mid-19th century. Based in Brooklyn, New York, the company built at least 27 marine engines between 1845 and 1855, including engines for some of the fastest and finest steamboats of the era. The company also built and repaired steam engines and boilers of all types, as well as doing other metalwork. The company failed and was liquidated in 1855.

History 
 
The earliest known records of the West Street Foundry, also known at this time as Howell & Coffee, date to 1839. Principals of the firm were Joseph E. Coffee, then a 28-year-old engineer, and Maelzaer Howell. With Howell's death in 1842, Coffee became sole proprietor, and would continue his association with the firm throughout its history. Coffee's younger brother, George Wayne Coffee, was also an engineer and an associate of the firm. The business was located on the northwest corner of West and Beach Streets, Brooklyn, New York. 
 
In addition to marine engines, the company built stationary steam engines, and built and repaired both marine and stationary boilers as well as doing a variety of other metalwork. The company also bought and sold steamboats on commission, and sometimes offered steamboats in its possession for excursions or charter. The foundry's services were advertised as far afield as Alabama.

By 1850, the company had been acquired by Wilson Small, a prominent figure in the New York branch of the Democratic Party, with Coffee remaining as superintendent and agent. The company had 140 employees in 1850; by 1851 this number had risen to 200.  

The foundry is known to have built the engines for at least 27 steam vessels, though more are likely unaccounted for.

Wilson Small was forced to make an assignment of the business in 1855. He subsequently joined the civil service, while Coffee established a new steam engineering works in Keyport, New Jersey.

About the proprietors 

Joseph Ellis Coffee was born in Philadelphia on December 27, 1811. After training as an engineer and serving as a principal of the West Street Foundry until its closure, he established a new business offering similar services in Keyport, New Jersey, near the steamboat landing. The location was close to the shipyard of Benjamin C. Terry, with whom Coffee and Small had a longstanding business relationship; Coffee sometimes supervised the construction of steamers at Terry's yard, and Small was the original owner of at least seven vessels built there. In later years, Coffee served as Chief of Bureau of Steam with New York's Metropolitan Police.  

Coffee was a director and later vice-president of the Mechanics' Institute of New York,  and a director of the Brooklyn Fire Insurance Company. He died December 5, 1869, at the age of 58, and is buried at Green Grove Cemetery, Keyport.  

Wilson Small was born in New York City on February 13, 1810. Entering the workforce at the age of twelve, he trained as a jeweller, continuing in the trade until the panic of 1837. A growing engagement with politics led him to stand for political office, and he was elected to the New York State Assembly in 1846 and 1847. Later, he served as president of New York City's Tenth Ward. Following the failure of the West Street Foundry, Small joined the civil service, and subsequently obtained a variety of government positions. He was a Sachem and later, the longterm Sagamore of Tammany Hall, and a Grand Master of the Odd Fellows. He died October 21, 1886.

Production table  

The following table lists marine steam engines known to have been built by the West Street Foundry; the list is likely incomplete.

Footnotes

References

Bibliography  
  
   
   
  OCLC 1626009 
  OCLC 1626009  
   
   
   
   
  

1839 establishments in New York (state)
1855 disestablishments in New York (state)
American companies established in 1839
Defunct marine engineering companies of New York City
Manufacturing companies based in New York City